James Emmet Dalton MC (4 March 1898 – 4 March 1978) was an Irish soldier and film producer. He served in the British Army in the First World War, reaching the rank of captain. However, on his return to Ireland he became one of the senior figures in the Dublin Brigade of the guerrilla Irish Republican Army which fought against British rule in Ireland.

He was a close associate of Michael Collins and travelled with Collins to London separately from the Irish treaty negotiating team. He was military liaison officer for the treaty talks.  During the Irish Civil War, he held one of the highest ranks, as major general, in the pro-Treaty National Army but resigned his command following the death of Collins. Dalton later founded a film production company in London and founded Ardmore Studios in Wicklow together with Louis Elliman in 1958, producing a number of notable pictures in the 1950s and 1960s.

Early life
Dalton was born in Fall River, Massachusetts, to Irish-American parents James F. and Katharine L. Dalton. The family moved back to Ireland when he was two.  He grew up in a middle-class Catholic background in Drumcondra in North Dublin and lived at No. 8 Upper St. Columba's Road.  He was educated by the Christian Brothers at O'Connell School in North Richmond Street.  He joined the nationalist militia, the Irish Volunteers in 1913 and the following year, though only fifteen, was involved in the smuggling of arms into Ireland.

Military career

First World War
Dalton joined the British Army in 1915 for the duration of the Great War.  His decision was not that unusual among Irish Volunteers, as over 20,000 of the National Volunteers joined the British New Army on the urgings of Nationalist leader John Redmond.  Dalton's father, however, disagreed with his son's decision.  Emmet Dalton initially joined the 7th battalion of the Royal Dublin Fusiliers (RDF) as a temporary 2nd Lieutenant.  By 1916 he was attached to the 9th Battalion, RDF, 16th (Irish) Division under Major-General William Hickie, which contained many Irish nationalist recruits.

During the Battle of the Somme in September 1916, Dalton was involved in bloody fighting during the Battle of Ginchy, in which over 4,000 Irishmen were killed or wounded. Among the casualties was Tom Kettle, a former nationalist Member of Parliament and personal friend of Dalton's father and of Emmet.  Dalton was awarded the Military Cross for his conduct in the battle. Afterwards he was transferred to the 6th Battalion, Leinster Regiment, and sent to Salonika then Palestine, where he commanded a company and then supervised a sniper school in El Arish.  In 1918 Dalton was re-deployed again to France, and in July promoted to captain, serving as an instructor.

Irish War of Independence 
On demobilisation in April 1919, Dalton returned to Ireland. There, finding that his younger brother Charlie had joined the IRA, Dalton himself followed suit.  Dalton later commented on the apparent contradiction of fighting both with and against the British Army by saying that he had fought for Ireland with the British and fought for Ireland against them.

He became close to Michael Collins and rose swiftly to become IRA Director of Intelligence – and was involved in the Squad, the Dublin-based assassination unit. On 14 May 1921, Dalton led an operation with Paddy Daly that Dalton and Collins had devised. It was designed to rescue Gen. Sean McEoin from Mountjoy Prison using a hijacked British armoured car and two of Dalton's old British Army uniforms.

Irish Civil War 
Dalton followed Collins in accepting the Anglo-Irish Treaty in 1922 and was one of the first officers – a Major General – in the new National Army established by the Irish Provisional Government of the Irish Free State. The Treaty was opposed by much of the IRA and Civil War between pro and anti-treaty factions eventually resulted.

Dalton was in command of troops assaulting the Four Courts in the Battle of Dublin which marked the start of the war in June 1922.  At Collins' instigation Dalton, as Military liaison officer with the British during the truce, took control of the two 18-pounder guns from the British that were trained on the buildings. He became commander of the Free State Army under Mulcahy's direction.  He was behind the Irish Free State offensive of July–August 1922 that dislodged the Anti-Treaty fighters from the towns of Munster.  Dalton proposed seaborne landings to take the Anti-Treaty positions from the rear and he commanded one such naval landing that took Cork city in early August. In spite of firm loyalty to the National Army, he was critical of the Free State's failure to follow up its victory, allowing the Anti-Treaty IRA to regroup resuming the guerrilla warfare started in 1919.

On 22 August 1922, he accompanied Michael Collins in convoy, touring rural west Cork.  The convoy was ambushed near Béal na Bláth and Collins was killed in the firefight.  Dalton had advised him to drive on, but Collins, who was not an experienced combat veteran, insisted on stopping to fight.

Dalton was married shortly afterwards (on 9 October 1922) to Alice Shannon in Cork's Imperial Hotel. By December 1922 he had resigned his command in the Army. He did not agree with the execution of republican prisoners that marked the latter stages of the Civil War. After briefly working as clerk of the Irish Senate, he left this job to work in the movie industry.

Film industry
Over the following forty years, he worked in Ireland and the US in film production.  In 1958 he founded Irish Ardmore Studios in Bray.  His company helped produce films such as The Blue Max, The Spy Who Came in from the Cold and The Lion in Winter, all of which were filmed in Ireland. His daughter is Irish actress Audrey Dalton.

Death
Emmet Dalton died in his daughter Nuala's house in Dublin in 1978 on his 80th birthday, never having seen the film that Cathal O'Shannon of RTÉ had made on his life. During the making of the film they visited the battlefields in France (including Ginchy and Guillemont on the Somme), Kilworth Camp in Cork, Béal Na Bláth, and other places that Dalton had not visited since his earlier years. He wished to be buried as near as possible to his friend Michael Collins in Glasnevin Cemetery in Dublin and was buried there in March 1978 after a military funeral. None of the ruling Fianna Fail government ministers or TDs attended.

References

Reading references
 
 Turtle Bunbury, The Glorious Madness, Tales of The Irish and The Great War 
 Kettle, Tom & Dalton, Emmet, Mad Guns and Invisible Wands (Gill & Macmillan, Dublin 2014), pp. 99–115, 
 
 Townshend, Charles, Easter 1916: The Irish Rebellion (London 2006)
 Townshend, Charles, The Republic: The Fight For Independence (London 2013)

External links 
 

1898 births
1978 deaths
Burials in the Republic of Ireland
American people of Irish descent
Royal Dublin Fusiliers officers
Recipients of the Military Cross
Irish officers in the British Army
Irish people of World War I
Irish Republican Army (1919–1922) members
People of the Irish Civil War (Pro-Treaty side)
British Army personnel of World War I
Irish film producers
Place of birth missing
People from Drumcondra, Dublin
National Army (Ireland) generals
Military personnel from Massachusetts